Lea Stevens (born 15 June 1947) is a former South Australian politician. She was the Labor Party member for the electoral district of Little Para from the 1994 Elizabeth by-election to the 2010 state election.

Before her political career, Stevens gained a Bachelor of Science and Diploma of Education at the University of Adelaide. After her studies she worked as a high school principal at Fremont Elizabeth High School.

Stevens was the South Australian Minister for Health from early 2002 until late 2005, when she resigned for personal health reasons.

The 2006 election saw Stevens increase her margin to 16.7%, but Stevens retired at the 2010 state election, and was replaced by Lee Odenwalder.

References

External links
 
 Poll Bludger article

1947 births
Living people
Members of the South Australian House of Assembly
21st-century Australian politicians
21st-century Australian women politicians
Women members of the South Australian House of Assembly